Abraham Johannes Jacobus "Amos" du Plooy (31 May 1921 – 17 May 1980) was a South African rugby international.

Career
Du Plooy matriculated at Douglas and began studying at Stellenbosch University in 1939. After the Eastern Province team beat the British Lions 20–0 in 1955, Du Plooy became a Springbok at the age of 35. He only played the one test match for the Springboks.

Test history

See also
List of South Africa national rugby union players – Springbok no. 317

References

1921 births
1980 deaths
South African rugby union players
South Africa international rugby union players
Rugby union props
Western Province (rugby union) players
Eastern Province Elephants players
Rugby union players from the Northern Cape